Sarcochilus fitzgeraldii, commonly known as the ravine orchid,  is a lithophytic orchid endemic to eastern Australia. It forms large clumps with between four and eight dark green, linear leaves and up to fifteen white flowers with crimson spots near the centre.

Description
The side lobes are erect and the middle lobe is short and fleshy. Flowering occurs between October and November.

Taxonomy and naming
Sarcochilus fitzgeraldii was first formally described in 1870 by Ferdinand von Mueller and the description was published in Fragmenta phytographiae Australiae from a specimen collected near the Bellinger River by Robert Fitzgerald. The specific epithet (fitzgeraldii) honours the collector of the type specimen.

Distribution and habitat
The ravine orchid usually grows on rocks in dense rainforest or in shady gorges and ravines but sometimes also on the base of fibrous-barked trees. It is found between Maleny in south-east Queensland and the Macleay River in New South Wales.

Conservation
This orchid is class as "vulnerable" under the Australian Government Environment Protection and Biodiversity Conservation Act 1999 and the New South Wales Government Biodiversity Conservation Act 2016. The main threat to the species is illegal collecting. It was formerly an abundant species but has suffered from over-collecting.

References

fitzgeraldii
Endemic orchids of Australia
Orchids of New South Wales
Orchids of Queensland
Plants described in 1870
Taxa named by Ferdinand von Mueller